Adam Guziński (born 22 December 1970) is a Polish film director and screenwriter. His film Chłopiec na galopującym koniu was screened out of competition at the 2006 Cannes Film Festival.

Filmography
 Jakub (1997)
 Antychryst (2002)
 Chłopiec na galopującym koniu (2006)

References

External links

1970 births
Living people
Polish film directors
Polish screenwriters